Gamma Ray is the debut EP by Gamma Ray, a musical project by former Kyuss guitarist Josh Homme, released in 1996 by Man's Ruin Records. After the breakup of Kyuss in 1995, Homme recorded the Gamma Ray material in Seattle with producer Chris Goss, bassist Van Conner, and drummer Victor Indrizzo. Former Kyuss singer John Garcia contributed backing vocals to the track "Born to Hula". After the release of the EP, Homme received a cease and desist order because the name Gamma Ray was already in use by a German power metal band. He changed the name of the project to Queens of the Stone Age, and both of the Gamma Ray tracks were re-released the following year by Man's Ruin on the Kyuss / Queens of the Stone Age split EP, which featured some of the final studio recordings by Kyuss and debuted the "Queens of the Stone Age" moniker for Homme's new project. The split EP also included a third track from the Gamma Ray recording sessions, "Spiders and Vinegaroons".

Both tracks from the Gamma Ray EP were later re-recorded by Queens of the Stone Age. "If Only Everything" was re-recorded under the shortened title "If Only" for Queens of the Stone Age's debut album in 1998, while "Born to Hula" was re-recorded and appeared as a B-side on "The Lost Art of Keeping a Secret" single from the band's 2000 album Rated R.

Track listing

Personnel
Credits adapted from the EP's liner notes.
Josh Homme – vocals, guitar, bass guitar on "Born to Hula", mixing engineer, producer
Van Conner – bass guitar on "If Only Everything"
Vic "The Stick" Indrizzo – drums
John Garcia – backing vocals on "Born to Hula"
Chris Goss – producer
Floyd – recording engineer
Jay – recording engineer

References

1996 debut EPs
Queens of the Stone Age albums
Man's Ruin Records EPs
Albums produced by Josh Homme
Albums produced by Chris Goss